Bowler Hill is a summit in Jackson County in the U.S. state of Missouri.

Bowler Hill was named after J. O. F. Bowler, the original owner of the site.

References

 Landforms of Jackson County, Missouri
 Hills of Missouri